Smetlivy was one of 29 s (officially known as Project 7) built for the Soviet Navy during the late 1930s. Completed in 1938, she was assigned to the Baltic Fleet and played a minor role in the 1939–1940 Winter War against Finland. After the start of the German invasion of the Soviet Union (Operation Barbarossa) in June 1941, the ship participated in the Gulf of Riga Campaign before withdrawing to Tallinn, Estonia. Smetlivy supported Soviet forces during the defense of Tallinn in August and covered the subsequent evacuation to Leningrad. The ship provided naval gunfire support to the defenders of Leningrad over the next several months before she was assigned to evacuate Soviet troops from their enclave in Hanko, Finland, in November. Smetlivy struck several mines returning from Hanko and sank with heavy loss of life.

Design and description
Having decided to build the large and expensive   destroyer leaders, the Soviet Navy sought Italian assistance in designing smaller and cheaper destroyers.

Their crew numbered 197 officers and sailors in peacetime and 236 in wartime. The designers had been conservative in rating the turbines and many, but not all, of the ships handily exceeded their designed speed during their sea trials. Others fell considerably short of it, although specific figures for most individual ships have not survived.

As built, the Gnevny-class ships mounted four  B-13 guns in two pairs of superfiring single mounts fore and aft of the superstructure. Anti-aircraft defense was provided by a pair of  34-K AA guns in single mounts and a pair of  21-K AA guns as well as two  DK or DShK machine guns. They carried six  torpedo tubes in two rotating triple mounts; each tube was provided with a reload. The ships could also carry a maximum of either 60 or 95 mines and 25 depth charges. The ships were equipped with two K-1 paravanes intended to destroy mines and a pair of depth-charge throwers.

Construction and service 
Built in Leningrad's Shipyard No. 189 (Ordzhonike) as yard number 294, Smetlivy was laid down on 17 September 1936, launched on 16 July 1937, and was completed on 6 November 1938. Assigned to the Baltic Fleet, she served on patrol and escort duty during the Winter War, aside from bombarding the coastal artillery positions on the Finnish island of Russarö on 1 December 1939 with her sister ship  and the light cruiser .

When Operation Barbarossa, the German invasion of the Soviet Union, began on 22 June 1941, the destroyer was based in Ust-Dvinsk, Latvia, as part of the 1st Destroyer Division of the fleet's Light Forces Detachment. She participated in the defense of the Gulf of Riga, laying minefields in the Irben Straits during the nights of 24/25 and 26/27 June; she was damaged by two near misses by bombs on 25 June. The ship sailed to Kuivastu, Estonia, on the 27th and then helped to escort Kirov through the Moonsund archipelago to Tallinn, Estonia, three days later as the Soviets evacuated their forces from the Gulf of Riga. Smetlivy steamed to Leningrad for repairs on 15 July which were completed on the 27th.

The ship bombarded German positions during the defense of Tallinn between 24 and 28 August, firing 456 shells from her main guns. She covered the evacuation of Tallinn on 28–29 August as part of the detachment of main forces led by Kirov. Together with the minelayer , Smetlivy laid a minefield off Gogland Island on 10 September. She bombarded German positions on 3–5 October in support amphibious landings in the Peterhof area. On 14 October the destroyer was attached to the group of ships in the River Neva and moved to the Ust-Izhora area to provide gunfire support. Smetlivy supported a local counter-attack near Sinyavino between 20 and 25 October. During 1941 the ship fired a total of 700 shells from her 130 mm guns.

On 4 November she was assigned to the second convoy helping to evacuate the garrison of Hanko to Kronstadt, together with the destroyer . While loading 560 evacuees, Smetlivy was struck by a Finnish artillery shell. On the return voyage, a mine exploded in her paravanes at 23:10 and knocked out her engines. Twenty minutes later, another mine explosion detonated her forward magazine and blew off her bow all the way back to her bridge. At 23:50 she struck yet another mine that broke her in half, killing over half of her crew and passenger. Smetlivy was officially struck from the Navy List on 19 November.

Citations

Sources

Further reading
 

Gnevny-class destroyers
1937 ships
Ships built at the Baltic Shipyard
Ships sunk by mines
Shipwrecks in the Baltic Sea
Maritime incidents in November 1941